Luiggi or Luigi Giafferi (25 March 1668 Talasani – 1 October 1748) was a prime minister of Kingdom of Corsica (1736) and régent of Corsica (1736-1738).

References

1668 births
1748 deaths
Corsican politicians
Corsican nationalists